Castalius is a butterfly genus in the family Lycaenidae. They are commonly known as Pierrots. This name is also often used for the very closely related genus Tarucus.

In fact, the delimitation of Castalius versus Tarucus is not yet fully resolved, with some species, such as the dark Pierrot (T. ananda), having been moved between the two genera repeatedly. Regardless of how this may turn out, the African species formerly placed in Castalius are now in Tuxentius (pied Pierrots) and Zintha (blue-eyed Pierrot), which are also very close relatives (in particular the former).

Species
Only four species are placed in Castalius nowadays. But as noted above, it may be that Tarucus and the present genus are eventually regarded as synonymous. In that case, the older name Castalius would again apply to the two dozen species in question.

 Castalius clathratus (Holland, [1891]) Celebes
 Castalius fasciatus (Röber, 1887) Celebes
 Castalius fluvialis (Grose-Smith, 1895) Celebes
 Castalius rosimon (Fabricius, 1775) – common Pierrot

Footnotes

References

  (2008): Tree of Life Web Project – Castalius Hübner 1819. Pierrots. Version of 19 May 2008. Retrieved 29 November 2009. 
  (2009): Markku Savela's Lepidoptera and some other life forms – Castalius. Version of 30 March 2009. Retrieved 29 November 2009.

 
Lycaenidae genera